The 2005 WNBA All-Star Game was played on July 9, 2005 at Mohegan Sun Arena in Uncasville, Connecticut, home of the Connecticut Sun. The game was the 6th annual WNBA All-Star Game. This was the first time Connecticut hosted the basketball showcase.

The All-Star Game

Rosters

Coaches
The coach for the Western Conference was Seattle Storm coach Anne Donovan. The coach for the Eastern Conference was Connecticut Sun coach Mike Thibault.

References

Wnba All-star Game, 2005
Women's National Basketball Association All-Star Game